The evolution of fish began about 530 million years ago during the Cambrian explosion. It was during this time that the early chordates developed the skull and the vertebral column, leading to the first craniates and vertebrates. The first fish lineages belong to the Agnatha, or jawless fish. Early examples include Haikouichthys. During the late Cambrian, eel-like jawless fish called the conodonts, and small mostly armoured fish known as ostracoderms, first appeared. Most jawless fish are now extinct; but the extant lampreys may approximate ancient pre-jawed fish. Lampreys belong to the Cyclostomata, which includes the extant hagfish, and this group may have split early on from other agnathans.

The earliest jawed vertebrates probably developed during the late Ordovician period. They are first represented in the fossil record from the Silurian by two groups of fish: the armoured fish known as placoderms, which evolved from the ostracoderms; and the Acanthodii (or spiny sharks). The jawed fish that are still extant in modern days also appeared during the late Silurian: the Chondrichthyes (or cartilaginous fish) and the Osteichthyes (or bony fish). The bony fish evolved into two separate groups: the Actinopterygii (or ray-finned fish) and Sarcopterygii (which includes the lobe-finned fish).

During the Devonian period a great increase in fish variety occurred, especially among the ostracoderms and placoderms, and also among the lobe-finned fish and early sharks. This has led to the Devonian being known as the age of fishes. It was from the lobe-finned fish that the tetrapods evolved, the four-limbed vertebrates, represented today by amphibians, reptiles, mammals, and birds. Transitional tetrapods first appeared during the early Devonian, and by the late Devonian the first tetrapods appeared. The diversity of jawed vertebrates may indicate the evolutionary advantage of a jawed mouth; but it is unclear if the advantage of a hinged jaw is greater biting force, improved respiration, or a combination of factors. Fish do not represent a monophyletic group, but a paraphyletic one, as they exclude the tetrapods.

Fish, like many other organisms, have been greatly affected by extinction events throughout natural history. The earliest ones, the Ordovician–Silurian extinction events, led to the loss of many species. The Late Devonian extinction led to the extinction of the ostracoderms and placoderms by the end of the Devonian, as well as other fish. The spiny sharks became extinct at the Permian–Triassic extinction event; the conodonts became extinct at the Triassic–Jurassic extinction event. The Cretaceous–Paleogene extinction event, and the present day Holocene extinction, have also affected fish variety and fish stocks.



Overview

Fish may have evolved from an animal similar to a coral-like sea squirt (a tunicate), whose larvae resemble early fish in important ways. The first ancestors of fish may have kept the larval form into adulthood (as some sea squirts do today), although this path cannot be proven.

Vertebrates, among them the first fishes, originated about 530 million years ago during the Cambrian explosion, which saw the rise in organism diversity.

The first ancestors of fish, or animals that were probably closely related to fish, were Pikaia, Haikouichthys and Myllokunmingia. These three genera all appeared around 530 Ma. Pikaia had a primitive notochord, a structure that could have developed into a vertebral column later. Unlike the other fauna that dominated the Cambrian, these groups had the basic vertebrate body plan: a notochord, rudimentary vertebrae, and a well-defined head and tail. All of these early vertebrates lacked jaws in the common sense and relied on filter feeding close to the seabed.

These were followed by indisputable fossil vertebrates in the form of heavily armoured fishes discovered in rocks from the Ordovician Period 500–430 Ma.

The first jawed vertebrates appeared in the late Ordovician and became common in the Devonian, often known as the "Age of Fishes". The two groups of  bony fishes, the actinopterygii and sarcopterygii, evolved and became common. The Devonian also saw the demise of virtually all jawless fishes, save for lampreys and hagfish, as well as the Placodermi, a group of armoured fish that dominated much of the late Silurian. The Devonian also saw the rise of the first labyrinthodonts, which was a transitional between fishes and amphibians.

The colonisation of new niches resulted in diversification of body plans and sometimes an increase in size. The Devonian Period (395 to 345 Ma) brought in such giants as the placoderm Dunkleosteus, which could grow up to seven meters long, and early air-breathing fish that could remain on land for extended periods. Among this latter group were ancestral amphibians.

The reptiles appeared from labyrinthodonts in the subsequent Carboniferous period. The anapsid and synapsid amniotas were common during the late Paleozoic, while the diapsids became dominant during the Mesozoic. In the sea, the bony fishes became dominant.

The later radiations, such as those of fish in the Silurian and Devonian periods, involved fewer taxa, mainly with very similar body plans. The first animals to venture onto dry land were arthropods. Some fish had lungs and strong, bony fins and could crawl onto the land also.

Jawless fishes

Jawless fishes belong to the superclass Agnatha in the phylum Chordata, subphylum Vertebrata. Agnatha comes from the Greek, and means "no jaws". It excludes all vertebrates with jaws, known as gnathostomes. Although a minor element of modern marine fauna, jawless fish were prominent among the early fish in the early Paleozoic. Two types of Early Cambrian animal which apparently had fins, vertebrate musculature, and gills are known from the early Cambrian Maotianshan shales of China: Haikouichthys and Myllokunmingia. They have been tentatively assigned to Agnatha by Janvier. A third possible agnathid from the same region is Haikouella. Another possible agnathid that has not been formally described was reported by Simonetti from the Middle Cambrian Burgess Shale of British Columbia.

Many Ordovician, Silurian, and Devonian agnathians were armoured with heavy, bony, and often elaborately sculpted, plates derived from mineralized scales. The first armoured agnathans—the Ostracoderms, precursors to the bony fish and hence to the tetrapods (including humans)—are known from the middle Ordovician, and by the Late Silurian the agnathans had reached the high point of their evolution. Most of the ostracoderms, such as thelodonts, osteostracans, and galeaspids, were more closely related to the gnathostomes than to the surviving agnathans, known as cyclostomes. Cyclostomes apparently split from other agnathans before the evolution of dentine and bone, which are present in many fossil agnathans, including conodonts. Agnathans declined in the Devonian and never recovered.

The agnathans as a whole are paraphyletic, because most extinct agnathans belong to the stem group of gnathostomes. Recent molecular data, both from rRNA and from mtDNA strongly supports the theory that living agnathans, known as cyclostomes, are monophyletic. In phylogenetic taxonomy, the relationships between animals are not typically divided into ranks, but illustrated as a nested "family tree" known as a cladogram. Phylogenetic groups are given definitions based on their relationship to one another, rather than purely on physical traits such as the presence of a backbone. This nesting pattern is often combined with traditional taxonomy, in a practice known as evolutionary taxonomy.

The cladogram below for jawless fish is based on studies compiled by Philippe Janvier and others for the Tree of Life Web Project. († = group is extinct)

†Conodonts

Conodonts resembled primitive jawless eels. They appeared 520 Ma and were wiped out 200 Ma. Initially they were known only from tooth-like microfossils called conodont elements. These "teeth" have been variously interpreted as filter-feeding apparatuses or as a "grasping and crushing array". Conodonts ranged in length from a centimeter to the 40 cm Promissum. Their large eyes had a lateral position, which makes a predatory role unlikely. The preserved musculature hints that some conodonts (Promissum at least) were efficient cruisers but incapable of bursts of speed. In 2012 researchers classified the conodonts in the phylum Chordata on the basis of their fins with fin rays, chevron-shaped muscles and notochord. Some researchers see them as vertebrates similar in appearance to modern hagfish and lampreys, though phylogenetic analysis suggests that they are more derived than either of these groups.

†Ostracoderms

Ostracoderms (shell-skinned) are armoured jawless fishes of the Paleozoic. The term does not often appear in classifications today because it is paraphyletic or polyphyletic, and has no phylogenetic meaning. However, the term is still used informally to group together the armoured jawless fishes.

The ostracoderm armour consisted of 3–5 mm polygonal plates that shielded the head and gills, and then overlapped further down the body like scales. The eyes were particularly shielded. Earlier chordates used their gills for both respiration and feeding, whereas ostracoderms used their gills for respiration only. They had up to eight separate pharyngeal gill pouches along the side of the head, which were permanently open with no protective operculum. Unlike invertebrates that use ciliated motion to move food, ostracoderms used their muscular pharynx to create a suction that pulled small and slow moving prey into their mouths.

The first fossil fishes that were discovered were ostracoderms. The Swiss anatomist Louis Agassiz received some fossils of bony armored fish from Scotland in the 1830s. He had a hard time classifying them as they did not resemble any living creature. He compared them at first with extant armored fish such as catfish and sturgeons but later realizing that they had no movable jaws, classified them in 1844 into a new group "ostracoderms".

Ostracoderms existed in two major groups, the more primitive heterostracans and the cephalaspids. Later, about 420 million years ago, the jawed fish evolved from one of the ostracoderms. After the appearance of jawed fish, most ostracoderm species underwent a decline, and the last ostracoderms became extinct at the end of the Devonian period.

Jawed fish

The vertebrate jaw probably originally evolved in the Silurian period and appeared in the Placoderm fish, which further diversified in the Devonian. The two most anterior pharyngeal arches are thought to have become the jaw itself and the hyoid arch, respectively. The hyoid system suspends the jaw from the braincase of the skull, permitting great mobility of the jaws. Already long assumed to be a paraphyletic assemblage leading to more derived gnathostomes, the discovery of Entelognathus suggests that placoderms are directly ancestral to modern bony fish.

As in most vertebrates, fish jaws are bony or cartilaginous and oppose vertically, comprising an upper jaw and a lower jaw. The jaw is derived from the most anterior two pharyngeal arches supporting the gills, and usually bears numerous teeth. The skull of the last common ancestor of today's jawed vertebrates is assumed to have resembled sharks.

It is thought that the original selective advantages offered by the jaw were not related to feeding, but to increases in respiration efficiency. The jaws were used in the buccal pump (observable in modern fish and amphibians) that pumps water across the gills of fish or air into the lungs in the case of amphibians. Over evolutionary time the more familiar use of jaws (to humans) in feeding was selected for and became a very important function in vertebrates. Many teleost fish have substantially modified their jaws for suction feeding and jaw protrusion, resulting in highly complex jaws with dozens of bones involved.

Jawed vertebrates and jawed fish evolved from earlier jawless fish, and the cladogram below for jawed vertebrates is a continuation of the cladogram in the section above. († = group is extinct)

†Placoderms

Placoderms, class Placodermi (plate skinned), are extinct armoured prehistoric fish, which appeared about 430 Ma in the Early to Middle Silurian. They were mostly wiped out during the Late Devonian Extinction event, 378 Ma, though some survived and made a slight recovery in diversity during the Famennian epoch before dying out entirely at the close of the Devonian, 360 mya; they are ultimately ancestral to modern gnathostome vertebrates. Their head and thorax were covered with massive and often ornamented armoured plates. The rest of the body was scaled or naked, depending on the species. The armour shield was articulated, with the head armour hinged to the thoracic armour. This allowed placoderms to lift their heads, unlike ostracoderms. Placoderms were the first jawed fish; their jaws likely evolved from the first of their gill arches. The chart on the right shows the rise and demise of the separate placoderm lineages: Acanthothoraci,  Rhenanida,  Antiarchi,  Petalichthyidae,  Ptyctodontida and Arthrodira.

†Spiny sharks

Spiny sharks, class Acanthodii, are extinct fishes that share features with both bony and cartilaginous fishes, though ultimately more closely related to and ancestral to the latter. Despite being called "spiny sharks", acanthodians predate sharks, though they gave rise to them. They evolved in the sea at the beginning of the Silurian Period, some 50 million years before the first sharks appeared. Eventually competition from bony fishes proved too much, and the spiny sharks died out in Permian times about 250 Ma. In form they resembled sharks, but their epidermis was covered with tiny rhomboid platelets like the scales of holosteans (gars, bowfins).

Cartilaginous fishes

Cartilaginous fishes, class Chondrichthyes, consisting of sharks, rays and chimaeras, appeared by about 395 million years ago, in the middle Devonian, evolving from acanthodians. The class contains the sub classes Holocephali (chimaera) and Elasmobranchii (sharks and rays). The radiation of elasmobranches in the chart on the right is divided into the taxa: Cladoselache, Eugeneodontiformes, Symmoriida, Xenacanthiformes, Ctenacanthiformes, Hybodontiformes, Galeomorphi, Squaliformes and Batoidea.

Bony fishes

Bony fishes, class Osteichthyes, are characterised by bony skeleton rather than cartilage. They appeared in the late Silurian, about 419 million years ago. The recent discovery of Entelognathus strongly suggests that bony fishes (and possibly cartilaginous fishes, via acanthodians) evolved from early placoderms. A subclass of the Osteichthyes, the ray-finned fishes (Actinopterygii), have become the dominant group of fishes in the post-Paleozoic and modern world, with some 30,000 living species.

The bony (and cartilaginous) fish groups that emerged after the Devonian, were characterised by steady improvements in foraging and locomotion.

Lobe-finned fishes

Lobe-finned fishes, fish belonging to the class Sarcopterygii, are mostly extinct bony fishes, basally characterised by robust and stubby lobe fins containing a robust internal skeleton, cosmoid scales and internal nostrils. Their fins are fleshy, lobed, paired fins, joined to the body by a single bone. The fins of lobe-finned fish differ from those of all other fish in that each is borne on a fleshy, lobelike, scaly stalk extending from the body. The pectoral and pelvic fins are articulated in ways resembling the tetrapod limbs they were the precursors to. The fins evolved into the legs of the first tetrapod land vertebrates, amphibians. They also possess two dorsal fins with separate bases, as opposed to the single dorsal fin of ray-finned fish. The braincase of lobe-finned fishes primitively has a hinge line, but this is lost in tetrapods and lungfish. Many early lobe-finned fishes have a symmetrical tail. All lobe-finned fishes possess teeth covered with true enamel.

Lobe-finned fishes, such as coelacanths and lungfish, were the most diverse group of bony fishes in the Devonian. Taxonomists who subscribe to the cladistic approach include the grouping Tetrapoda within the Sarcopterygii, and the tetrapods in turn include all species of four-limbed vertebrates. The fin-limbs of lobe-finned fishes such as the coelacanths show a strong similarity to the expected ancestral form of tetrapod limbs. The lobe-finned fish apparently followed two different lines of development and are accordingly separated into two subclasses, the Rhipidistia (including the lungfish, and the Tetrapodomorpha, which include the Tetrapoda) and the Actinistia (coelacanths). The first lobe-finned fishes, found in the uppermost Silurian (ca 418 Ma), closely resembled spiny sharks, which became extinct at the end of the Paleozoic. In the early–middle Devonian (416 - 385 Ma), while the predatory placoderms dominated the seas, some lobe-finned fishes came into freshwater habitats.

In the Early Devonian (416-397 Ma), the lobe-finned fishes split into two main lineages — the coelacanths and the rhipidistians. The former never left the oceans and their heyday was the Late Devonian and Carboniferous, from 385 to 299 Ma, as they were more common during those periods than in any other period in the Phanerozoic; coelacanths still live today in the oceans (genus Latimeria). The Rhipidistians, whose ancestors probably lived in estuaries, migrated into freshwater habitats. They in turn split into two major groups: the lungfish and the tetrapodomorphs. The lungfish's greatest diversity was in the Triassic period; today there are fewer than a dozen genera left. The lungfish evolved the first proto-lungs and proto-limbs, developing the ability to live outside a water environment in the middle Devonian (397-385 Ma). The first tetrapodomorphs, which included the gigantic rhizodonts, had the same general anatomy as the lungfish, who were their closest kin, but they appear not to have left their water habitat until the late Devonian epoch (385 - 359 Ma), with the appearance of tetrapods (four-legged vertebrates). Tetrapods are the only tetrapodomorphs that survived after the Devonian. Lobe-finned fishes continued until towards the end of Paleozoic era, suffering heavy losses during the Permian-Triassic extinction event (251 Ma).

Ray-finned fishes

Ray-finned fishes, class Actinopterygii, differ from lobe-finned fishes in that their fins consist of webs of skin supported by spines ("rays") made of bone or horn. There are other differences in respiratory and circulatory structures. Ray-finned fishes normally have skeletons made from true bone, though this is not true of sturgeons and paddlefishes.

Ray-finned fishes are the dominant vertebrate group, containing half of all known vertebrate species. They inhabit abyssal depths in the sea, coastal inlets and freshwater rivers and lakes, and are a major source of food for humans.

Timeline
The Late Devonian extinctions played a crucial role in shaping the evolution of fish, or vertebrates in general. Fishes evolved during the Early Paleozoic, and in the Devonian all modern groups (Agnatha, Chondrichthyes, and Osteichthyes) were already present. Devonian aquatic environments were also marked by placoderms and acanthodians, which are only known from fossils, however. After suffering large losses during the Late Devonian extinctions, cartilaginous fishes (Chondrichthyes) and the Actinopterygii among the bony fishes (Osteichthyes) diversified.

The sections below describe the pre-Devonian origin of fish, their Devonian radiation, including the conquest of land by early tetrapods, and the post-Devonian evolution of fishes.

Pre Devonian: Origin of fish

Devonian: Age of fish

The Devonian Period is broken into the Early, Middle and Late Devonian. By the start of the Early Devonian 419 mya, jawed fishes had divided into four distinct clades: the placoderms and spiny sharks, both of which are now extinct, and the cartilaginous and bony fishes, both of which are still extant. The modern bony fish, class Osteichthyes, appeared in the late Silurian or early Devonian, about 416 million years ago. Both the cartilaginous and bony fish may have arisen from either the placoderms or the spiny sharks. A subclass of bony fish, the ray-finned fishes (Actinopterygii), have become the dominant group in the post-Paleozoic and modern world, with some 30,000 living species.

Sea levels in the Devonian were generally high. Marine faunas were dominated by bryozoa, diverse and abundant brachiopods, the enigmatic hederelloids, microconchids and corals. Lily-like crinoids were abundant, and trilobites were still fairly common. Among vertebrates, jawless armoured fish (ostracoderms) declined in diversity, while the jawed fish (gnathostomes) simultaneously increased in both the sea and fresh water. Armoured placoderms were numerous during the lower stages of the Devonian Period but became extinct in the Late Devonian, perhaps because of competition for food against the other fish species. Early cartilaginous (Chondrichthyes) and bony fish (Osteichthyes) also become diverse and played a large role within the Devonian seas. The first abundant genus of shark,  Cladoselache, appeared in the oceans during the Devonian Period. The great diversity of fish around at the time have led to the Devonian being given the name "The Age of Fish" in popular culture.

The first ray-finned and lobe-finned bony fish appeared in the Devonian, while the placoderms began dominating almost every known aquatic environment. However, another subclass of Osteichthyes, the Sarcopterygii, including lobe-finned fish including coelacanths and lungfish) and tetrapods, was the most diverse group of bony fish in the Devonian. Sarcopterygians are basally characterized by internal nostrils, lobe fins containing a robust internal skeleton, and cosmoid scales.

During the Middle Devonian 393–383 Ma, the armoured jawless ostracoderm fish were declining in diversity; the jawed fish were thriving and increasing in diversity in both the oceans and freshwater. The shallow, warm, oxygen-depleted waters of Devonian inland lakes, surrounded by primitive plants, provided the environment necessary for certain early fish to develop essential characteristics such as well developed lungs and the ability to crawl out of the water and onto the land for short periods of time. Cartilaginous fish, class Chondrichthyes, consisting of sharks, rays and chimaeras, appeared by about 395 million years ago, in the middle Devonian

During the Late Devonian the first forests were taking shape on land. The first tetrapods appear in the fossil record over a period, the beginning and end of which are marked with extinction events. This lasted until the end of the Devonian 359 mya. The ancestors of all tetrapods began adapting to walking on land, their strong pectoral and pelvic fins gradually evolved into legs (see Tiktaalik). In the oceans, primitive sharks became more numerous than in the Silurian and the late Ordovician. The first ammonite mollusks appeared. Trilobites, the mollusk-like brachiopods and the great coral reefs, were still common.

The Late Devonian extinction occurred at the beginning of the last phase of the Devonian period, the Famennian faunal stage, (the Frasnian-Famennian boundary), about  Ma. Many fossil agnathan fish, save for the psammosteid heterostracans, make their last appearance shortly before this event. The Late Devonian extinction crisis primarily affected the marine community, and selectively affected shallow warm-water organisms rather than cool-water organisms. The most important group affected by this extinction event were the reef-builders of the great Devonian reef-systems.

A second extinction pulse, the Hangenberg event closed the Devonian period and had a dramatic impact on vertebrate faunas. Placoderms mostly became extinct during this event, as did most members of other groups including lobe-finned fish, acanthodians and early tetrapods in both marine and terrestrial habitats, leaving only a handful of survivors. This event has been related to glaciation in the temperate and polar zones as well as euxinia and anoxia in the seas.

{| class="wikitable" style="clear: both; margin-left: 5em"
|-
| colspan="5" style="text-align:center; background:#ddf8f8;"| Devonian (419–359 mya): The start of Devonian saw the first appearance of lobe-finned fish, precursors to the tetrapods (animals with four limbs). Major groups of fish evolved during this period, often referred to as the age of fish. See :Category:Devonian fish.
|-
| colspan="5" |
|-
! rowspan=20 style="background:; text-align: center" | Devonian
| rowspan=6 style="background:; text-align: center" | EarlyDevonian
| colspan="3"  style="text-align:center; background:#ddf8f8;"| Early Devonian (419–393 Ma):
|-
| 
| Psarolepis
| Psarolepis (speckled scale) is a genus of extinct lobe-finned fish that lived around 397 to 418 Ma. Fossils of Psarolepis have been found mainly in South China and described by paleontologist Xiaobo Yu in 1998. It is not known for certain which group Psarolepis belongs, but paleontologists agree that it probably is a basal genus and seems to be close to the common ancestor of lobe-finned and ray-finned fishes.
|-
| 
| Holoptychius
| Holoptychius is an extinct genus from the order of porolepiform lobe-finned fish, extant from 416 to 359 Ma. Its rounded scales and body form indicate that it could have swum quickly through the water to catch prey. Similar to other rhipidistians, it had fang-like teeth on its palate in addition to smaller teeth on the jaws. Its asymmetrical tail sported a caudal fin on its lower end. To compensate for the downward push caused by this fin placement, Holoptychius'''s pectoral fins were placed high on the body.
|-
| 
| Ptyctodontida
| The ptyctodontids (beak-teeth) are an extinct monotypic order of unarmored placoderms, containing only one family. They were extant from the start to the end of the Devonian. With their big heads, big eyes, and long bodies, the ptyctodontids bore a strong resemblance to modern day chimaeras (Holocephali). Their armor was reduced to a pattern of small plates around the head and neck. Like the extinct and related acanthothoracids, and the living and unrelated holocephalians, most of the ptyctodontids are thought to have lived near the sea bottom and preyed on shellfish.
|-
| 
| Petalichthyida
| The Petalichthyida was an order of small, flattened placoderms that existed from the beginning of the Devonian to the Late Devonian. They were typified by splayed fins and numerous tubercles that decorated all of the plates and scales of their armour. They reached a peak in diversity during the Early Devonian and were found throughout the world. Because they had compressed body forms, it is supposed they were bottom-dwellers that chased after or ambushed smaller fish. Their diet is not clear, as none of the fossil specimens found have preserved mouth parts.
|-
| 
| Laccognathus| Laccognathus (pitted jaw) was a genus of amphibious lobe-finned fish that existed 398–360 Ma. They were characterized by the three large pits (fossae) on the external surface of the lower jaw, which may have had sensory functions. They had very short dorsoventrally flattened heads, less than one-fifth the length of the body. The skeleton was structured so large areas of skin were stretched over solid plates of bone. This bone was composed of particularly dense fibers – so dense that exchange of oxygen through the skin was unlikely. Rather, the dense ossifications served to retain water inside the body as Laccognathus traveled on land between bodies of water.
|-
| rowspan=6 style="text-align:center; background:" | MiddleDevonian
| colspan="3"  style="text-align:center; background:#ddf8f8;"| Middle Devonian (393–383 Ma): Cartilaginous fish, consisting of sharks, rays and chimaeras, appeared about 395 Ma.
|-
| 
| Cheirolepis| Cheirolepis (hand fin) was a genus of ray-finned fishes. It was among the most basal of the Devonian ray-finned fish and is considered the first to possess the "standard" dermal cranial bones seen in later ray-finned fish.
|-
| 
| Coccosteus| Coccosteus (seed bone) is an extinct genus of arthrodire placoderm. The majority of fossils have been found in freshwater sediments, though they may have been able to enter saltwater. Like all other arthrodires, Coccosteus had a joint between the armour of the body and skull. It also had an internal joint between its neck vertebrae and the back of the skull, allowing it to open its mouth even wider. Along with the longer jaws, this allowed Coccosteus to feed on fairly large prey. As with all other arthrodires, Coccosteus had bony dental plates embedded in its jaws, forming a beak. The beak was kept sharp by having the edges of the dental plates grind away at each other.
|-
| 
| Bothriolepis| Bothriolepis (pitted scale) was the most successful genus of antiarch placoderms, if not the most successful genus of any placoderm, with over 100 species spread across Middle to Late Devonian strata across every continent.
|-
| 
| Pituriaspida
| Pituriaspida (hallucinogenic shield) is a class containing two bizarre species of armoured jawless fish with tremendous nose-like rostrums. They lived in estuaries around 390 Ma. The paleontologist Gavin Young, named the class after the hallucinogenic drug pituri, since he thought he might be hallucinating upon viewing the bizarre forms. The better studied species looked like a throwing-dart-like, with an elongate headshield and spear-like rostrum. The other species looked like a guitar pick with a tail, with a smaller and shorter rostrum and a more triangular headshield.
|-
| colspan="3"  style="line-height:16px; background:#dddddd;"| Late Devonian extinction: 375–360 Ma. A prolonged series of extinctions eliminated about 19% of all families, 50% of all genera and 70% of all species. This extinction event lasted perhaps as long as 20 Ma, and there is evidence for a series of extinction pulses within this period.
|-
| rowspan=8 style="text-align:center; background:" | LateDevonian
| colspan="3"  style="text-align:center; background:#ddf8f8;"| Late Devonian (383–359 Ma):
|-
| 
| Cladoselache| Cladoselache was the first abundant genus of early chondrichthyan, related to modern sharks (though probably closer to holocephalans like chimaeras), appearing about 370 Ma. It had a streamlined body almost entirely devoid of scales, with five to seven gill slits and a short, rounded snout that had a terminal mouth opening at the front of the skull. It had a very weak jaw joint compared with modern-day sharks, but it compensated for that with very strong jaw-closing muscles. Its teeth were multi-cusped and smooth-edged, making them suitable for grasping, but not tearing or chewing. Cladoselache therefore probably seized prey by the tail and swallowed it whole. It had powerful keels that extended onto the side of the tail stalk and a semi-lunate tail fin, with the superior lobe about the same size as the inferior.
|-
| 
| Dipterus| Dipterus (two wings) is an extinct genus of lungfish from 376 to 361 Ma. Like its ancestor Dipnorhynchus it had tooth-like plates on its palate instead of real teeth. However, unlike its modern relatives, in which the dorsal, caudal, and anal fin are fused into one, its fins were still separated. Otherwise Dipterus closely resembled modern lungfish.
|-
| 
| Dunkleosteus| Dunkleosteus is a genus of arthrodire placoderms that existed from 380 to 360 Ma. It was a hypercarnivorous apex predator. Apart from its contemporary Titanichthys (below), no other placoderm rivalled it in size. Instead of teeth, Dunkleosteus had two pairs of sharp bony plates, which formed a beak-like structure. Apart from megalodon, it had the most powerful bite of any fish, generating bite forces in the same league as Tyrannosaurus rex and the modern crocodile.
|-
| 
| Titanichthys| Titanichthys is a genus of giant, aberrant marine placoderm that lived in shallow seas. Many of the species approached Dunkleosteus in size and build. Unlike its relative, however, the various species of Titanichys had small, ineffective-looking mouth-plates that lacked a sharp cutting edge. It is assumed that Titanichthys was a filter feeder that used its capacious mouth to swallow or inhale schools of small, anchovy-like fish, or possibly krill-like zooplankton, and that the mouth-plates retained the prey while allowing the water to escape as it closed its mouth.
|-
| 
| Materpiscis| Materpiscis (mother fish) is a genus of ptyctodontid placoderm from about 380 Ma. Known from only one specimen, it is unique in having an unborn embryo present inside, and with remarkable preservation of a mineralised placental feeding structure (umbilical cord). This makes Materpiscis the first known vertebrate to show viviparity, or giving birth to live young. The specimen was named Materpiscis attenboroughi in honour of David Attenborough.

|-
| 
| Hyneria
|-
| 
| Rhizodonts
| Rhizodonts were an order of lobe-finned fish that survived to the end of the Carboniferous, 377–310 Ma. They reached huge sizes. The largest known species, Rhizodus hibberti grew up to 7 metres in length, making it the largest freshwater fish known.
|}

Fish to tetrapods

The first tetrapods are four-legged, air-breathing, terrestrial animals from which the land vertebrates descended, including humans. They evolved from lobe-finned fish of the clade Sarcopterygii, appearing in coastal water in the middle Devonian, and giving rise to the first amphibians.

The group of lobe-finned fishes that were the ancestors of the tetrapod are grouped together as the Rhipidistia, and the first tetrapods evolved from these fish over the relatively short timespan 385–360 Ma. The early tetrapod groups themselves are grouped as Labyrinthodontia. They retained aquatic, fry-like tadpoles, a system still seen in modern amphibians. From the 1950s to the early 1980s it was thought that tetrapods evolved from fish that had already acquired the ability to crawl on land, possibly so they could go from a pool that was drying out to one that was deeper. However, in 1987, nearly complete fossils of Acanthostega from about  showed that this Late Devonian transitional animal had legs and both lungs and gills, but could never have survived on land: its limbs and its wrist and ankle joints were too weak to bear its weight; its ribs were too short to prevent its lungs from being squeezed flat by its weight; its fish-like tail fin would have been damaged by dragging on the ground. Its skeleton differed from that of most fish, in ways that enabled it to raise its head to breathe air while its body remained submerged, including: its jaws show modifications that would have enabled it to gulp air; the bones at the back of its skull are locked together, providing strong attachment points for muscles that raised its head; the head is not joined to the shoulder girdle and it has a distinct neck.

The Devonian proliferation of land plants may help to explain why air-breathing would have been an advantage: leaves falling into streams and rivers would have encouraged the growth of aquatic vegetation; this would have attracted grazing invertebrates and small fish that preyed on them; they would have been attractive prey but the environment was unsuitable for the big marine predatory fish; air-breathing would have been necessary because these waters would have been short of oxygen, since warm water holds less dissolved oxygen than cooler marine water and since the decomposition of vegetation would have used some of the oxygen.

There are three major hypotheses as to how tetrapods evolved their stubby fins (proto-limbs). The traditional explanation is the "shrinking waterhole hypothesis" or "desert hypothesis" posited by the American paleontologist Alfred Romer. He believed limbs and lungs may have evolved from the necessity of having to find new bodies of water as old waterholes dried up.

The second hypothesis is the "inter-tidal hypothesis" put forward in 2010 by a team of Polish paleontologists led by Grzegorz Niedźwiedzki. They argued that sarcopterygians may have first emerged unto land from intertidal zones rather than inland bodies of water. Their hypothesis is based on the discovery of the 395 million-year-old Zachełmie tracks in Zachełmie, Poland, the oldest ever discovered fossil evidence of tetrapods.

The third hypothesis, the "woodland hypothesis", was proposed by the American paleontologist Gregory J. Retallack in 2011. He argues that limbs may have developed in shallow bodies of water in woodlands as a means of navigating in environments filled with roots and vegetation. He based his conclusions on the evidence that transitional tetrapod fossils are consistently found in habitats that were formerly humid and wooded floodplains.

Research by Jennifer A. Clack and her colleagues showed that the very earliest tetrapods, animals similar to Acanthostega, were wholly aquatic and quite unsuited to life on land. This is in contrast to the earlier view that fish had first invaded the land — either in search of prey (like modern mudskippers) or to find water when the pond they lived in dried out — and later evolved legs, lungs, etc.

Two ideas about the homology of arms, hands and digits have existed in the past 130 years. First that digits are unique to tetrapods  and second that antecedents were present in the fins of early sarcopterygian fish. Until recently it was believed that "genetic and fossil data support the hypothesis that digits are evolutionary novelties".p. 640. However new research that created a three-dimensional reconstruction of Panderichthys, a coastal fish from the Devonian period 385 million years ago, shows that these animals already had many of the homologous bones present in the forelimbs of limbed vertebrates. For example, they had radial bones similar to rudimentary fingers but positioned in the arm-like base of their fins.  Thus there was in the evolution of tetrapods a shift such that the outermost part of the fins were lost and eventually replaced by early digits. This change is consistent with additional evidence from the study of actinopterygians, sharks and lungfish that the digits of tetrapods arose from pre-existing distal radials present in more primitive fish. Controversy still exists since Tiktaalik, a vertebrate often considered the missing link between fishes and land-living animals, had stubby leg-like limbs that lacked the finger-like radial bones found in the Panderichthys. The researchers of the paper commented that it "is difficult to say whether this character distribution implies that Tiktaalik is autapomorphic, that Panderichthys and tetrapods are convergent, or that Panderichthys is closer to tetrapods than Tiktaalik. At any rate, it demonstrates that the fish–tetrapod transition was accompanied by significant character incongruence in functionally important structures.".p. 638.

From the end of the Devonian to the Mid Carboniferous a 30 million year gap occurs in the fossil record. This gap, called Romer's gap, is marked by the absence of ancestral tetrapod fossils and fossils of other vertebrates that look well-adapted for life on land.

By the late Devonian, land plants had stabilized freshwater habitats, allowing the first wetland ecosystems to develop, with increasingly complex food webs that afforded new opportunities. Freshwater habitats were not the only places to find water filled with organic matter and choked with plants with dense vegetation near the water's edge. Swampy habitats like shallow wetlands, coastal lagoons and large brackish river deltas also existed at this time, and there is much to suggest that this is the kind of environment in which the tetrapods evolved. Early fossil tetrapods have been found in marine sediments, and because fossils of primitive tetrapods in general are found scattered all around the world, they must have spread by following the coastal lines — they could not have lived in freshwater only.
 Fossil Illuminates Evolution of Limbs from Fins Scientific American, 2 2 April 2004.

Post Devonian
 During the Carboniferous period, fish diversity seemingly declined and reached low levels during the Permian period.
 The Mesozoic Era began about 252 million years ago in the wake of the Permian-Triassic event, the largest mass extinction in Earth's history, and ended about 66 million years ago with the Cretaceous–Paleogene extinction event, another mass extinction that killed off non-avian dinosaurs, as well as other plant and animal species. It is often referred to as the Age of Reptiles because reptiles were the dominant vertebrates of the time. The Mesozoic witnessed the gradual rifting of the supercontinent Pangaea into separate landmasses. The climate alternated between warming and cooling periods; overall the Earth was hotter than it is today. Bony fishes remained largely unaffected by the Permian-Triassic extinction event.
The Mesozoic saw the diversification of neopterygian fishes, the clade that consists of holostean and teleost fishes. Most of them belong were small in size. The diversity of body shape variety in Triassic, Jurassic, and Early Cretaceous neopterygian fishes has been documented, revealing that the accumulation of novel body shapes in teleost fishes was predominantly gradual throughout this 150 million year period (250Mya - 100Mya). Holostean fishes appear to accumulate body shape variety (so called disparity) between the early Triassic and Toarcian, after which the amount of variety seen among their body shapes remained stable until the end of the Early Cretaceous.

{| class="wikitable"
|-
! rowspan=8 style="background:" | Carbon-iferous
| colspan="3"  style="text-align:center; background:#ddf8f8;"| Carboniferous (359–299 Ma): Sharks underwent a major evolutionary radiation during the Carboniferous. It is believed that this evolutionary radiation occurred because the decline of the placoderms at the end of the Devonian period caused many environmental niches to become unoccupied and allowed new organisms to evolve and fill these niches.
|-
| colspan="3"  style="line-height:16px; background:#dddddd;"| 
|-
| 
| Stethacanthus| 
As a result of the evolutionary radiation, carboniferous cartilaginous fishes assumed a wide variety of bizarre shapes—including cartilaginous fishes (holocephalian, relative of modern ratfishes) of the family Stethacanthidae, which possessed a flat brush-like dorsal fin with a patch of denticles on its top. Stethacanthus unusual fin may have been used in mating rituals. Apart from the fins, Stethacanthidae resembled Falcatus (below).
|-
| 
| Falcatus
|  Falcatus is a genus of small cladodont-toothed cartilaginous fishes that lived 335–318 Ma. They are characterised by the prominent fin spines that curved anteriorly over their heads.
|-
| 
| Belantsea
| Belantsea is a representative of the Carboniferous to Permian order Petalodontiformes. Petalodontiforms are characterized by their peculiar teeth. The group became extinct in the late Permian (Wuchiapingian). One of the last survivors was Janassa, which superficially looked like modern rays, though it is not closely related with them.
|-
| 
| Orodus
| Orodus is another cartilaginous fish of the Carboniferous, a genus from the family Orodontidae that lived into the early Permian from 303 to 295 Ma.
|-
| 
| Chondrenchelys
| Chondrenchelys is an extinct genus of cartilaginous fish from the Carboniferous period. It had an elongate, eel-like body. Chondrenchelys is a holocephalan and a distant relative of modern ratfishes.
|-
| 
| Edestus
| 
Edestus is a genus of the extinct eugeneodontid order, a group of cartilaginous fishes that is related with modern chimerids (ratfishes). Other Carboniferous genera aare Bobbodus, Campodus, and Ornithoprion. Eugeneodontids were common during the Carboniferous period. Members of this order typically had tooth whorls, mostly formed by their lower jaws. In Edestus, both the upper and lower jaws formed a tooth whorl.
|-
! rowspan=7 style="background:" | Permian
| colspan="3"  style="text-align:center; background:#ddf8f8;"| Permian (298–252 Ma):
|-
| 
| Helicoprion
| 
Helicoprion is arguably the most iconic genus of the extinct Eugeneodontida. This order of cartilaginous fishes is related with extant chimerids (ratfishes). Eugeneodontids disappeared during the Permian period, with only a few genera surviving into the earliest Triassic (Caseodus, Fadenia). Typically, members of this group had tooth whorls.
|-
| 
| Triodus
| Triodus is a genus of xenacanthid cartilaginous fish. The order Xenacanthida existed during the Carboniferous to Triassic period, and is well known from many complete skeletons from the early Permian. They typically had a prominent dorsal fin spine, which in some species was attached to the back of their skull, while in others it was located more posteriorly. Xenacanthids were ferocious freshwater predators.
|-
| 
| Acanthodes
| Acanthodes is an extinct genus of spiny shark (Acanthodii). It had gills but no teeth, and was presumably a filter feeder. Acanthodes had only two skull bones and were covered in cubical scales. Each paired pectoral and pelvic fins had one spine, as did the single anal and dorsal fins, giving it a total of six spines, less than half that of many other spiny sharks. Acanthodians share qualities of both bony fish (osteichthyes) and cartilaginous fish (chondrichthyes), and it has been suggested that they may have been stem chondrichthyans and stem gnathostomes. Spiny sharks became extinct in the Permian.
|-
| 
| Palatinichthys
| Megalichthyids are an extinct family of lobe-finned fish. They are tetrapodomorphs, a group of lobe-finned fish that is closely related with land-living vertebrates. Megalichthyids survived into the Permian, but became extinct during this period. Palatinichthys from the early Permian of Germany was one of the last survivors of this clade.
|-
| 
| Acrolepis
| Acrolepis is a genus of palaeoniscoid ray-finned fish that existed during the Carboniferous to Triassic period. It had elongate jaws and its eyes were located in the front of the skull. Acrolepis had a heterocercal tail fin and fusiform body. The body was covered in thick ganoid scales. This morphology is typical for many late Palaeozoic ray-fins.
|-
| colspan="3"  style="line-height:16px; background:#dddddd;"| The Permian ended with the most extensive extinction event recorded in paleontology: the Permian-Triassic extinction event. 90% to 95% of marine species became extinct, as well as 70% of all land organisms. It is also the only known mass extinction of insects.  Recovery from the Permian-Triassic extinction event was protracted; land ecosystems took 30M years to recover, and marine ecosystems took even longer. However, bony fishes were mostly not affected by this extinction event.
|-
! rowspan=8 style="background:" | Triassic
| colspan="3"  style="text-align:center; background:#ddf8f8;"| Triassic (252–201 Ma): The fish fauna of the Early Triassic was remarkably uniform, reflecting the fact that the surviving families dispersed globally after the Permian-Triassic extinction. A considerable radiation of ray-finned fishes occurred during the Triassic, laying the foundation for many modern fishes. See :Category:Triassic fish.
|-
| 
| Foreyia
| 
The Middle Triassic Foreyia, along with Ticinepomis, is one of the earliest known members of the family Latimeriidae, which also includes the extant coelacanth Latimeria. Foreyia had an atypical body shape for a coelacanth, a group that is otherwise known for their conservative morphology. Rebellatrix is another Triassic coelacanth with an aberrant morphology. This genus is characterized by a forked caudal fin, suggesting that Rebellatrix was a fast swimmer. Coelacanths had one of their highest post-Devonian diversity during the Early Triassic.
|-
| 
| Saurichthys
| 
Saurichthyiformes are an extinct clade of ray-finned fish that evolved shortly before the Permian-Triassic extinction, and that rapidly diversified after the event. Some Middle Triassic species show evidence for viviparity in the form of embryos that are preserved in females, and gonopodia in males. This is the earliest case of a viviparous ray-finned fish. Saurichthys was also the first ray-fin to show adaptations for ambush predation.
|-
| 
| Perleidus
| 
Perleidus was a ray-finned fish from the Middle Triassic. About  in length, it was a marine predatory fish with jaws that hung vertically under the braincase, allowing them to open wide. The Triassic Perleidiformes were very diverse in shape and showed distinct feeding specializations in their teeth. Colobodus, for example, had strong, button-like teeth. Some perleidiforms, such as Thoracopterus, were the first ray-fins to glide over water, much like extant flying fish, with which they are only distantly related.
|-
| 
| Robustichthys
| Robustichthys is a Middle Triassic ionoscopiform ray-finned fish. They belong to the clade Halecomorphi, which were once diverse during the Mesozoic Era, but which are today represented by only a single species, the bowfin. Halecomorphs are holosteans, a clade which first appeared in the fossil record during the Triassic. 
|-
| 
| Semionotus
| 
Semionotiformes are an extinct order of holostean ray-finned fish that existed from during the Mesozoic Era. They were characterized by thick scales and specialized jaws. The are relatives of modern gars, both belonging to the clade Ginglymodi. This clade first appears in the fossil record during the Triassic. Once diverse, they are only represented by a few species today. 
|-
| 
| Pholidophorus
Although not closely related to the modern herring, it was somewhat like herring in appearance and niche. It had a single dorsal fin, a symmetrical tail, and an anal fin placed towards the rear of the body. It had large eyes and was probably a fast swimming predator, hunting planktonic crustaceans and smaller fish. A very early teleost/teleosteomorph, Pholidophorus had many primitive characteristics such as ganoid scales and a spine that was partially composed of cartilage, rather than bone. Teleosts first appeared in the fossil record during the Triassic. One of the earliest members is Prohalecites (Ladinian).
|-
| colspan="3"  style="line-height:16px; background:#dddddd;"| The Triassic ended with the Triassic–Jurassic extinction event. About 23% of all families, 48% of all genera (20% of marine families and 55% of marine genera) and 70% to 75% of all species became extinct. Ray-finned fishes, however, remained largely unaffected by this extinction event. Non-dinosaurian archosaurs continued to dominate aquatic environments, while non-archosaurian diapsids continued to dominate marine environments.
|-
! rowspan=4 style="background:" | Jurassic
| colspan="3"  style="text-align:center; background:#ddf8f8;"| Jurassic (201–145 Ma): During the Jurassic period, the primary vertebrates living in the seas were fish and marine reptiles. The latter include ichthyosaurs who were at the peak of their diversity, plesiosaurs, pliosaurs, and marine crocodiles of the families Teleosauridae and Metriorhynchidae. Numerous turtles could be found in lakes and rivers. See :Category:Jurassic fish.
|-
| 
| Pachycormiformes
| 
Pachycormiformes are an extinct order of ray-finned fish that existed from the Early Jurassic to the K-Pg extinction (below). They were characterized by serrated pectoral fins, reduced pelvic fins and a bony rostrum. Their relations with other fish are unclear.
|-
| 
| Leedsichthys
| Along with its close pachycormid relatives Bonnerichthys and Rhinconichthys, Leedsichthys is part of a lineage of large-sized filter-feeders that swam the Mesozoic seas for over 100 million years, from the middle Jurassic until the end of the Cretaceous period. Pachycormids might represent an early branch of Teleostei, the group most modern bony fishes belong to; in that case Leedsichthys is the largest known teleost fish.
|-
| 
| Ichthyodectidae
| 

The family Ichthyodectidae (literally "fish-biters") was a family of marine actinopterygian fish. They first appeared 156 Ma during the Late Jurassic and disappeared during the K-Pg extinction event 66 Ma. They were most diverse throughout the Cretaceous period. Sometimes classified in the primitive bony fish order Pachycormiformes, they are today generally regarded as members of the "bulldog fish" order Ichthyodectiformes in the far more advanced Osteoglossomorpha. All known taxa were predators, feeding on smaller fish; in several cases, larger Ichthyodectidae preyed on smaller members of the family. Some species had remarkably large teeth, though others, such as Gillicus arcuatus, had small ones and sucked in their prey. The largest Xiphactinus was 20 feet long, and appeared in the Late Cretaceous (below).
|-
! rowspan=7 style="background:" | Cret-aceous
| colspan="3"  style="text-align:center; background:#ddf8f8;"| Cretaceous (145–66 Ma): See :Category:Cretaceous fish.
|-
| 
| Sturgeon
| True sturgeons appear in the fossil record during the Upper Cretaceous. Since that time, sturgeons have undergone remarkably little morphological change, indicating their evolution has been exceptionally slow and earning them informal status as living fossils.  This is explained in part by the long generation interval, tolerance for wide ranges of temperature and salinity, lack of predators due to size, and the abundance of prey items in the benthic environment.
|-
| 
| Cretoxyrhina
|
Cretoxyrhina mantelli was a large shark that lived about 100 to 82 million years ago, during the mid Cretaceous period. It is commonly known as the Ginsu Shark.
This shark was first identified by a famous Swiss Naturalist, Louis Agassiz in 1843, as Cretoxyhrina mantelli. However, the most complete specimen of this shark was discovered in 1890, by the fossil hunter Charles H. Sternberg, who published his findings in 1907. The specimen consisted of a nearly complete associated vertebral column and over 250 associated teeth. This kind of exceptional preservation of fossil sharks is rare because a shark's skeleton is made of cartilage, which is not prone to fossilization. Charles dubbed the specimen Oxyrhina mantelli. This specimen represented a  shark.
|-
| 
| Enchodus
|
Enchodus is an extinct genus of bony fish. It flourished during the Upper Cretaceous and was small to medium in size. One of the genus' most notable attributes are the large "fangs" at the front of the upper and lower jaws and on the palatine bones, leading to its misleading nickname among fossil hunters and paleoichthyologists, "the saber-toothed herring". These fangs, along with a long sleek body and large eyes, suggest Enchodus was a predatory species.
|-
| 
| Xiphactinus
| 

Xiphactinus is an extinct genus of large predatory marine bony fish of the Late Cretaceous.
|-
| 
| Ptychodus
|-
| colspan="3"  style="line-height:16px; background:#dddddd;"| The end of the Cretaceous was marked by the Cretaceous–Paleogene extinction event (K-Pg extinction). There are substantial fossil records of jawed fishes across the K–T boundary, which provides good evidence of extinction patterns of these classes of marine vertebrates. Within cartilaginous fish, approximately 80% of the sharks, rays, and skates families survived the extinction event, and more than 90% of teleost fish (bony fish) families survived. There is evidence of a mass kill of bony fishes at a fossil site immediately above the K–T boundary layer on Seymour Island near Antarctica, apparently precipitated by the K–Pg extinction event. However, the marine and freshwater environments of fishes mitigated environmental effects of the extinction event, and evidence shows that there was a major increase in size and abundance of teleosts immediately after the extinction, apparently due to the elimination of their ammonite competitors (there was no similar change in shark populations across the boundary).
|-
! rowspan=3 style="background:" | CenozoicEra
| colspan="3"  style="text-align:center; background:#ddf8f8;"| Cenozoic Era (66 Ma to present): The current era has seen great diversification of bony fishes. Fishes of myriad varieties are the main predators in most of the world's water bodies, both freshwater and marine.
|-
| 
| Amphistium
| Amphistium is a 50-million-year-old fossil fish that has been identified as an early relative of the flatfish, and as a transitional fossil. In a typical modern flatfish, the head is asymmetric with both eyes on one side of the head. In Amphistium, the transition from the typical symmetric head of a vertebrate is incomplete, with one eye placed near the top of the head.
|-
| 
| Otodus megalodon
| 

Megalodon is an extinct species of shark that lived about 28 to 1.5 Ma. Found in all oceans it was one of the largest and most powerful predators in vertebrate history, and probably had a profound impact on marine life.
|}

Prehistoric fish

Prehistoric fish are early fish that are known only from fossil records. They are the earliest known vertebrates, and include the first and extinct fish that lived through the Cambrian to the Tertiary. The study of prehistoric fish is called paleoichthyology. A few living forms, such as the coelacanth are also referred to as prehistoric fish, or even living fossils, due to their current rarity and similarity to extinct forms. Fish that have become recently extinct are not usually referred to as prehistoric fish.

Living fossilsJawless fishes Hagfish
 LampreyBony fishes Arowana and Arapaima
 Bowfin
 Coelacanth
 Gar
 Queensland lungfish
 Protanguilla palau (eel)
 Sturgeons and paddlefish
 BichirSharks' Blind shark
 Bullhead shark
 Elephant shark
 Frilled shark
 Goblin shark
 Gulper shark

The coelacanth was thought to have gone extinct , until a living specimen belonging to the order was discovered in 1938 off the coast of South Africa.

Fossil sites

Some fossil sites that have produced notable fish fossils

 Abbey Wood SSSI
 Besano Formation
 Bracklesham Beds
 Bear Gulch Limestone
 Burgess Shale
 Canowindra
 Cleveland Shale
 Crato Formation
 Dura Den
 Feltville Formation
 Fossil Butte National Monument
 Fur Formation
 Gogo Formation
 Green's Creek
 Green River Formation
 Guanling Formation
 Kakwa Provincial Park
 Land Grove Quarry
 Maotianshan Shales
 Matanuska Formation
 McAbee Fossil Beds
Miguasha National Park
Milwaukee Formation
 MoClay
 Monte Bolca
 Mount Ritchie
 Orcadian Basin
 Posidonia Shale
 Portishead Pier to Black Nore SSSI
 Santana Formation
 Southerham Grey Pit
 Thanet Formation
 Towaco Formation
 Weydale
 Zhoukoudian

Fossil collections

Some notable fossil fish collections.

 Fossil fish collection Natural History Museum, Britain.
 Collection and expertise Museum für Naturkunde, Germany.
 Fossil fishes The Field Museum, United States.

Paleoichthyologists
Paleoichthyology is the scientific study of the prehistoric life of fish. Listed below are some researchers who have made notable contributions to paleoichthyology.

 Louis Agassiz
 Mary Anning
 Michael Benton
 Derek Briggs
 Hans C. Bjerring
 John Samuel Budgett
 Henri Cappetta
 Meemann Chang
 Frederick Chapman
 Jenny Clack
 Ted Daeschler
 Bashford Dean
 Robert Dick
 Philip Grey Egerton
 Brian G. Gardiner
 Sam Giles
 Lance Grande
 Edwin Sherbon Hills
 Jeffrey A. Hutchings
 Thomas Henry Huxley
 Johan Aschehoug Kiær
 Philippe Janvier
 Erik Jarvik
 George V. Lauder (biologist)
 John A. Long
 Hugh Miller
 Charles Moore
 Paul E. Olsen
 Heinz Christian Pander
 Elizabeth Philpot
 Jean Piveteau
 Colin Patterson
 Alfred Romer
 Ira Rubinoff
 Lauren Sallan
 Neil Shubin
 Franz Steindachner
 Erik Stensiö
 Ramsay Heatley Traquair
 Thomas Stanley Westoll
 Tiberius Cornelis Winkler
 Arthur Smith Woodward

 See also 

 Comparative anatomy
 Convergent evolution in fish
 Evolution of paired fins
 Ichthyolith
 List of years in paleontology
 Old Red Sandstone
 Parodies of the ichthys symbol
 Prehistoric life
 Walking fish - fish with tetrapod-like features
 Vertebrate paleontology

 References 

Citations

Bibliography

 
 
 
 
 
 
 
 
 
 
 
 
 
 
 
 
 
 
 
 
 
 

Further reading

 Benton MJ (1998) "The quality of the fossil record of the vertebrates"  Pages 269–303 in Donovan, SK and Paul CRC (eds), The adequacy of the fossil record. Wiley. .
 
 Janvier, Philippe (1998) Early Vertebrates, Oxford, New York: Oxford University Press. 
 Long, John A. (1996) The Rise of Fishes: 500 Million Years of Evolution Johns Hopkins University Press. 
 McKenzie DJ, Farrell AP and Brauner CJ (2011) Fish Physiology: Primitive Fishes Academic Press. .
 Maisey JG (1996) [https://books.google.com/books?id=gAiAPwAACAAJ&q=editions:_y8O0MW7spIC fossil fishes] Holt. .
 
 Shubin, Neil (2009) Your inner fish: A journey into the 3.5-billion-year history of the human body Vintage Books. .
 Introduction to the Vertebrates Museum of Palaeontology, University of California.

External links
 Fossil Fish
 Origins of Fish
 Overview of evolution – Carl Sagan
 The Origin of Vertebrates Marc W. Kirschner, iBioSeminars.
 150 Million Years of Fish Evolution in One Handy Figure ScientificAmerican, 29 August 2013.
 Age Of Fishes Museum , Canowindra - a permanent exhibition some of the best of the thousands of fossils dating from the Devonian Period found nearby.

Fish
Prehistoric fish